The Blue Marble is a photograph of Earth taken on December 7, 1972, from a distance of around  from the planet's surface. Taken by the crew of the Apollo 17 spacecraft on its way to the Moon, it is one of the most reproduced images in history.

It mainly shows Earth from the Mediterranean Sea to Antarctica. This was the first time the Apollo trajectory made it possible to photograph the south polar ice cap, despite the Southern Hemisphere being heavily covered in clouds. In addition to the Arabian Peninsula and Madagascar, almost the entire coastline of Africa and most of the Indian Ocean are clearly visible, a cyclone in the Indian Ocean is also visible, the South Asian mainland is on the eastern limb.

NASA has also applied the name to a 2012 series of images which cover the entire globe at relatively high resolution. These were created by looking through satellite pictures taken over time in order to find as many cloudless photographs as possible to use in the final images. NASA has verified all images of the 2012 "blue marble" are composites as they cannot get far enough away and have to combine multiple photos together. Likewise, these images do not fit together properly and due to lighting, weather and cloud interference it is impossible to collect cohesive or fully clear images to begin with.

The photograph 

The photograph, taken on December 7, 1972, is one of the most widely distributed photographic images in existence. The astronauts had the Sun above them when they took the image. To the astronauts, the slightly gibbous Earth had the appearance and size of a glass marble, hence the name.

History

Context
The Blue Marble was not the first clear color image taken of an illuminated face of Earth, since such images by satellites had already been made and released as early as 1967, and is the second time such a photo was taken by a person after the 1968 photograph Earthrise taken by William Anders of Apollo 8.

Before the Blue Marble a picture of the fully illuminated Earth by the ATS-3 satellite was used in 1968 by Stewart Brand for his Whole Earth Catalog, after campaigning since 1966 to have NASA release a then-rumored satellite image of the entire Earth as seen from space. He got inspired during an LSD trip, seeing a "psychedelic illusion" of the Earth's curvature, convincing him that a picture of the entire planet would change how humans related to it. He sold and distributed buttons for 25 cents each that asked: "Why haven't we seen a photograph of the whole Earth yet?" During this campaign, Brand met Richard Buckminster Fuller, who offered to help Brand with his project. Several of the pins made their way to NASA employees.

The Apollo 17 image, however, released during a surge in environmental activism during the 1970s, became a symbol of the environmental movement, as a depiction of Earth's fragility, vulnerability, and isolation amid the vast expanse of space.

Today, as speculated by NASA archivist Mike Gentry, The Blue Marble is among the most widely distributed images in history.

Circumstances

The photograph's official NASA designation is AS17-148-22727. It is the third of a series of shots which were taken just before and are nearly identical, NASA photograph AS17-148-22725 and AS17-148-22726, the second also having been used as a full-Earth image. The widely published versions are cropped and chromatically adjusted from the original photographs.

According to the photograph description by NASA it was taken at  05:39 a.m. EST, 5 hours 6 minutes after launch of the Apollo 17 mission, and about 1 hour 54 minutes after the spacecraft left its parking orbit around Earth to begin its trajectory to the Moon. Alternatively, Eric Hartwell has identified it as having been taken slightly earlier at 5 hours 3 minutes, when one crew member states having changed the f-number, presumably between AS17-148-22725, the first of the series of photos, and the following less exposed images like the Blue Marble. At that time Africa was in noon daylight and with the December solstice approaching, Antarctica was also illuminated.

The photograph is at times oriented with Earth's south pointing up, relative to the capsule. In Eric Hartwell's analysis, Earth's north is pointing up from the seat which he has identified as the vantage point.

The picture shows many weather systems, featuring a Shapyro-Keyser cyclone near to the center of the image. Cyclone Sixteen (16B) can be seen in the upper right of the image. This storm had brought flooding and high winds to the Indian state of Tamil Nadu on December 5, two days before the photograph was taken. This image has also been used to validate state-of-the-art atmospheric reanalysis fifty years after it was taken.

The photographer used a 70-millimeter Hasselblad camera with an 80-millimeter Zeiss lens. NASA generally credits images to the whole crew of a mission. All crew members, Gene Cernan, Ronald Evans and Harrison Schmitt, took photographs during the mission with the onboard Hasselblad. They have largely avoided definitively answering the question of the photographer's identity by each member claiming to have taken it. However, interviews and evidence examined by Eric Hartwell after the mission suggest that Schmitt was the photographer.

Apollo 17 was the last crewed lunar mission. No human since has been far enough from Earth to photograph a whole-Earth image such as The Blue Marble, but whole-Earth images have been taken by many uncrewed spacecraft missions.

Subsequent Blue Marble images 
Subsequent similar images of Earth (including composites at much higher resolution) have also been termed Blue Marble images, and the phrase "blue marble" (as well as the picture itself) is frequently used, as in the Earth flag by environmental activist organizations or companies attempting to promote an environmentally conscious image. There has also been a children's television program called Big Blue Marble. Poet-diplomat Abhay Kumar penned an Earth anthem inspired by the Blue Marble which contains "all the peoples and the nations of the world, one for all, all for one, united we unfurl the blue marble flag".

Imaging series 2001–2004 

In 2002, NASA released an extensive set of satellite-captured imagery, including prepared images suitable for direct human viewing, as well as complete sets suitable for use in preparing further works. At the time, 1 km/pixel was the most detailed imagery available for free, and permitted for reuse without a need for extensive preparatory work to eliminate cloud cover and conceal missing data, or to parse specialized data formats. The data also included a similarly manually assembled cloud-cover and night-lights image sets, at lower resolutions.

A subsequent release was made in 2005, named Blue Marble Next Generation. This series of digital image mosaics was produced with the aid of automated image-sifting upon images from NASA's Earth Observatory, which enabled the inclusion of a complete, cloud-free globe for each month from January to December 2004, at even higher resolution (500 m/pixel). The original release of a single-image set covering the entire globe could not reflect the extent of seasonal snow-and-vegetative cover across both hemispheres, but this newer release closely modeled the changes of the seasons.

A number of interactive viewers for these data have also been released, among them a music visualization for the PlayStation 3 that is based on the texture data.

Blue Marble 2012 

On January 25, 2012, NASA released a composite image of the Western Hemisphere of Earth titled Blue Marble 2012. Robert Simmon  is most notable for his visualization of the Western Hemisphere. The picture logged over 3.1 million views on the Flickr image hosting website within the first week of release. On February 2, 2012, NASA released a companion to this new Blue Marble, showing a composite image of the Eastern Hemisphere from data obtained on January 23, 2012.

The picture is composed of data obtained by the Visible/Infrared Imager Radiometer Suite (VIIRS) instrument on board the Suomi NPP satellite on January 4, 2012. The data was obtained from six orbits of the Earth by the Suomi NPP over an eight-hour period. The image was created using a near-sided perspective projection with the viewing point placed 2100 km (1300 miles) above 20° North by 100° West. This projection results in a very wide-angle presentation such as one might get with a fish-eye lens, and it does not include the whole hemisphere.

Black Marble 2012 

On December 5, 2012, NASA released a nighttime view of Earth called Black Marble during an annual meeting of Earth scientists held by the American Geophysical Union in San Francisco. The images display all the human and natural matter that glows and can be detected from space. The data was acquired by the Suomi NPP satellite in April and October 2012 and then mapped over existing Blue Marble imagery of Earth to provide a realistic view of the planet. The Suomi NPP satellite completed 312 orbits and gathered 2.5 terabytes of data to get a clear shot of every parcel of the Earth's land surface.

The nighttime views were obtained with the new satellite's "day-night band" of the Visible Infrared Imaging Radiometer Suite (VIIRS), which detects light in a range of wavelengths from green to near-infrared, and uses filtering techniques to observe dim signals such as city lights, gas flares, auroras, wildfires, and reflected moonlight. Auroras, fires, and other stray light have been removed in the case of the Black Marble images to emphasize the city lights. The images have been used to study the spatial distribution of economic activity, to select sites for astronomical observatories, and to monitor human activities around protected areas.

DSCOVR 

On July 21, 2015, NASA released a new Blue Marble photograph taken by a U.S. Deep Space Climate Observatory (DSCOVR), a solar weather and Earth observation satellite that was launched in February 2015 and will provide a near-continuous view of the entire sunlit-side of the Earth. The image was taken on July 6, 2015. The photograph, of the Western Hemisphere, is centered over Central America. The Western United States, Mexico and the Caribbean are visible, but much of South America is hidden beneath cloud cover. Greenland can be seen at the upper edge of the image.

The EPIC science team plans to upload 13 new color images per day on their website. The color balance has been adjusted to approximate an image that could be seen with the average human eye. In addition to images, scientific information will be uploaded as it becomes available after in-flight calibration is complete. The science information will be ozone and aerosol amounts, cloud reflectivity, cloud height, and vegetation information.  The EPIC instrument views the Earth from sunrise in the west to sunset in the east 12 to 13 times per day as the Earth rotates at 15 degrees of longitude per hour. Clearly visible are storms forming over the Atlantic and Pacific Oceans, major slowly moving "cloud rivers", dust aerosol plumes from Africa, the sun's reflection in the oceans, ship exhaust tracks in the clouds, rivers and lakes, and the variegated land surface patterns especially in the African deserts. The spatial resolution of the color images is about 10 km (6 miles), and the resolution of the science products will be about 20 km (10 miles). Once every three months, lunar images are obtained that are the same as those viewed from Earth during our full Moon. On occasion, the other side of the Moon will appear in the Earth images as the Moon crosses in front of the Earth.

Cultural reception 
The picture has been identified as one of the most widely publicised and influential images since its release, particularly in the advocacy for environmental protection.

Its reflection, and of images from space in general, has been in parts critically analyzed as distracting from human geographic issues and from being a technological product produced by a dominant spacefaring country, which developed the image and its overview effect as a boundless worldview instead of as an image inviting an intricate and critical overview.

See also 

 DODGE, satellite which took the first color picture of the complete Earth disk
 Earth phases from the Moon
 Earthrise, another widely reproduced picture of the Earth, taken in 1968 by Bill Anders aboard Apollo 8
 First images of Earth from space
 Himawari 8 and 9, geostationary satellites that produce an image of the Earth's full face every 10 minutes in the daytime
 List of photographs considered the most important
 Pale Blue Dot, a 1990 image of the Earth taken by Voyager 1
 Pale Orange Dot, a NASA digital model showing a possible early Earth
 , author who lobbied NASA in 1966 to release a satellite photograph of the entire Earth because he thought it would be a powerful symbol
 The Day the Earth Smiled
 Space selfie
 Whole Earth Catalog, an eclectic catalog compiled by Brand which was inspired in part by photographs of the Earth as a globe

Explanatory notes

References

External links 

 NASA history of Blue Marble image releases

1972 photograph 
 Apollo Image Atlas – Photos from magazine NN of the 70 mm Hasselblad camera used on Apollo 17 (includes the Blue Marble photo and similar photographs)
 Apollo 17 in Real-time – The moment the Blue Marble photo was taken in the context of the rest of the Apollo 17 mission
 A short list of places in which the image has been used

21st century NASA composite images 
 Blue Marble (2002)
 Blue Marble Mapserver – Web interface for viewing small sections of the above
 Blue Marble: Next Generation (2005; one picture per month)
 Blue Marble Navigator – Web interface for viewing local sections of the above, incl. links to other such interfaces, download sites, etc.
 Blue Marble: Next Generation in NASA World Wind
 Wired: "New Satellite Takes Spectacular High-Res Image of Earth", with link to 2012 Composite in Super High Resolution
 "Earth at Night: It's the end of the night as you know it; you'll see fine." – NASA Earth Observatory site with various links around the 2012 and 2017 Black Marble images

1970s photographs
1972 works
1972 in art
Apollo program
Apollo 17
Color photographs
Gene Cernan
Harrison Schmitt
Photographs of Earth from outer space
Ronald Evans (astronaut)